Genome India Project (GIP) is a research initiative led by the Bangalore-based Indian Institute of Science's Centre for Brain Research and involves over 20 universities across the country in an effort to gather samples, compile data, conduct research, and create a ‘Indian reference genome' grid.

Background 
The initiative is funded by Department of Biotechnology (DBT) to sequence at least 10,000 Indian genomes in phase 1. The goal of the research is to develop predictive diagnostic indicators for several high-priority diseases and other uncommon and genetic disorders. In phase 2, the project would collect genetic samples from patients with three broad categories - cardiovascular diseases, mental illness, and cancer.

Participating institutions 
The list includes;
 All India Institute of Medical Sciences, Jodhpur
 Centre for Cellular and Molecular Biology
 Centre for DNA Fingerprinting and Diagnostics
 Institute of Genomics and Integrative Biology
 Gujarat Biotechnology Research Centre, Gandhinagar
 Indian Institute of Information Technology, Allahabad
 Indian Institute of Science Education and Research, Pune
 Indian Institute of Technology, Madras
 Indian Institute of Technology, Delhi
 Indian Institute of Technology Jodhpur
 Institute of Bioresources And Sustainable Development, Imphal
 Institute of Life Sciences, Bhubhaneswar
 Mizoram University
 National Centre for Biological Sciences
 National Institute of Biomedical Genomics
 National Institute of Mental Health and Neurosciences
 Rajiv Gandhi Centre for Biotechnology
 Sher-i-Kashmir Institute of Medical Sciences

References 

Genetics
Human genome projects